Legislative Assembly elections were held in Himachal Pradesh in 1977.

Results

Source

Constituency-wise results

References

External links
 Chief Electoral Officer, Himachal Pradesh

State Assembly elections in Himachal Pradesh
1970s in Himachal Pradesh
Himachal